56 Andromedae, abbreviated 56 And, is a probable binary star system in the northern constellation of Andromeda. 56 Andromedae is the Flamsteed designation. It has a combined apparent visual magnitude of 5.69, which is just bright enough to be dimly visible to the naked eye under good seeing conditions.

The brighter primary is an aging giant star with a stellar classification of K0 III, having exhausted the hydrogen at its core and evolved off the main sequence. It is a red clump giant, having undergone "helium flash" and is presently generating energy at its core through helium fusion. The star is about 3.1 billion years old with a negligible observable rotation rate, so the rotation axis of the star is likely pointing towards us. It has 1.3 times the mass of the Sun and has expanded to 11 times the Sun's radius The star is radiating 56 times the Sun's luminosity from its enlarged photosphere at an effective temperature of 4,765 K.

The faint secondary component is a magnitude 11.93 star located at an angular separation of  along a position angle (PA) of 77°, as of 2001. This has changed little since 1903 when it was at a separation of  along a PA of 80°.

References

External links
 Image 56 Andromedae

K-type giants
Horizontal-branch stars
Binary stars
Andromeda (constellation)
Durchmusterung objects
011749
Andromedae, 56
009021
0557